Following is a list of teams on the 2017–18 World Curling Tour, which was part of the 2017-18 curling season. Only the skips of the teams are listed.

Men's
As of December 11, 2017

 Shinya Abe 
 Carson Ackerman
 Jason Ackerman 
 Rob Ainsley
 Guy Algot
 Steve Allen 

 Ted Appelman
 Trevor Archibald

 Evgeniy Arkhipov
 Rob Atkins

 Felix Attinger
 Daryl Bachalo

 Josh Bahr
 Chris Baier 

 Kurt Balderston
 Travis Bale

 Greg Balsdon
 Christian Bangerter

 Alexander Baumann
 Mark Bice

 Daniel Birchard
 Todd Birr
 Dimitri Boada
 David Bohn
 Dennis Bohn

 Adam Boland
 Brendan Bottcher

 Peter Boudreau
 Tom Brewster

 Richard Brower
 Brian Brown

 Craig Brown
 Rolf Bruggmann

 Cameron Bryce 
 Randy Bryden

 Mike Callaghan
 Braden Calvert

 Reid Carruthers
 Adam Casey

 Jordan Chandler
 Jack Clasen

 Stu Cohen
 Joseph Comte

 Nicholas Connolly 
 Al Corbeil

 Brandon Corbett
 Denis Cordick

 Miles Craig 
 Warren Cross

 Scott Cruickshank
 Neil Currie

 Mark Dacey
 Chad Dahlseide

 Mitchell Dales
 Neil Dangerfield

 Peter de Cruz
 Nicholas Deagle 

 Carl deConinck Smith 
 Ryan Deis

 Dayna Deruelle
 Paul Dexter

 Ian Dickie
 Paul Dobson 

 Tyler Drews
 Tim Drobnick

 Greg Drummond
 Connor Duhaime

 Greg Dunn
 Scott Dunnam

 Simon Dupuis
 Kelsey Dusseault

 Garnet Eckstrand
 Wylie Eden

 Niklas Edin
 Greg Eigner

 John Epping
 Alexander Eremin

 Andrew Fairfull 
 Pete Fenson

 Martin Ferland
 Pat Ferris

 Craig Fischer
 Colton Flasch

 Mike Flemming
 Hayden Forrester

 Kyle Foster
 Michael Fournier 

 Ryan Freeze
 Adam Freilich 

 Joshua Friesen
 Rhett Friesz

 Hiromitsu Fujinaka
 Trevor Funk

 François Gagné
 Scott Garnett

 Sean Geall
 Jeff Ginter

 Matt Glandfield
 Chris Glibota

 Dale Goehring
 Masahiko Goto

 Scott Grassie
 Sean Grassie
 James Grattan
 Brent Gray

 Stuart Gresham
 Colin Griffith

 Jeff Guignard
 Ritvars Gulbis

 Jason Gunnlaugson
 Brad Gushue
 Matthew Hall
 Todd Hammond

 Ian Harley
 Neil Hart

 Jeff Hartung
 Jeremy Harty

 Jamie Hay
 Cory Heggestad

 Brad Heidt
 Drew Heidt
 Josh Heidt 
 Christian Heinimann

 Jan Hess
 Yves Hess

 Nick Hilton
 Timothy Hodek
 Steve Holdaway
 Mark Homan

 Tanner Horgan
 Darryl Horsman

 Glenn Howard
 Jeremy Hozjan

 Colin Huber
 Andrew Hunt

 Mike Hutchings
 Kenji Iwasaki

 Bret Jackson
 Glen Jackson 
 Brad Jacobs
 Jason Jacobson

 Ryan Jacques
 Borys Jasiecki

 Dean Joanisse
 Rob Johnson
 Dylan Johnston 
 Scott Jones

 Björn Jungen
 Junpei Kanda 
 Arihito Kasahara
 Aku Kauste

 Mark Kean
 Doug Kee

 Dale Kelly
 Brady Kendel

 Chris Kennedy 
 Kim Chang-min
 Kim Soo-hyuk
 Jamie King

 Rylan Kleiter
 Jamie Koe
 Kevin Koe
 Colin Koivula 

 Kenji Komoda 
 Nobukazu Komoribayashi
 Mikkel Krause 
 Richard Krell

 Hiromitsu Kuriyama
 Josh Lambden
 Rick Law
 Steve Laycock

 Bob Leclair 
 Julien Leduc
 Lee Jae-beom
 Alex Leichter 

 Jacob Libbus
 Harri Lill 
 Kristian Lindström
 Liu Rui

 Rob Lobel
 Mark Longworth 
 Trevor Loreth
 Tanner Lott

 Lucien Lottenbach
 Mark Lukowich
 William Lyburn
 Ma Xiuyue

 Patric Mabergs 
 Brent MacDougall

 Rob Maksymetz
 Jeremy Mallais

 Matthew Manuel
 Kelly Marnoch

 Yannick Martel
 Codey Maus

 Robert Mayhew
 Justin McBride

 Heath McCormick
 Gary McCullough

 Patrick McDonald
 Mike McEwen

 Darrell McKee
 Mike McLean

 Kelly McQuiggan
 Tim Meadows

 Terry Meek
 Steffen Mellemseter

 Marcelo Mello
 Jean-Michel Ménard

 David Misun
 Jason Montgomery

 Josh Moore
 Michael Moore
 Pierre-Luc Morissette
 Yusuke Morozumi

 John Morris
 Bruce Mouat

 John Paul Munich
 Richard Muntain 
 Jamie Murphy
 Sean Murray

 Kroy Nernberger
 Shungo Nomizo

 William Nordine
 Adam Norget 

 Andrew Nottingham
 Terry Odishaw
 Frank O'Driscoll

 Alan O'Leary
 Ryo Ogihara 
 Koto Onodera 

 Shane Parcels
 Greg Park

 Kevin Park
 Jason Peckham

 Greg Persinger
 Daley Peters

 Blair Pettipas
 Marc Pfister
 Rick Phillips

 Brent Pierce
 Graham Powell 

 Greg Power
 Owen Purcell

 Rob Retchless
 Joel Retornaz

 Spencer Richmond
 Cameron Rittenour

 Vincent Roberge
 Charlie Robert

 Alex Robichaud
 Sebastien Robillard

 Brent Ross
 Jean-Sébastien Roy

 Michael Roy 
 J. T. Ryan
 Yasuhiro Sano
 Nick Saturnino

 Scott Saunders
 Greg Schatzman

 Stephen Schneider
 Yannick Schwaller

 Kim-Lloyd Sciboz
 Thomas Scoffin

 Tom Scott
 Nicholas Servant
 Daryl Shane
 Randolph Shen

 Michael Shepherd
 Danny Sherrard 
 Kanya Shimizuno 
 John Shuster

 Lyle Sieg
 David Šik

 Pat Simmons
 Trent Skanes
 Aaron Sluchinski 
 Kārlis Smilga

 Greg Smith
 Jordan Smith

 Kyle Smith
 Riley Smith 
 Jiri Snitil
 Darryl Sobering

 Jon Solberg 
 Stefan Stähli 

 John Steel
 Tracy Steinke
 John Steski 
 Chad Stevens

 Braeden Stewart
 Jeffrey Stewart

 Rasmus Stjerne
 Andrew Stopera

 Bill Stopera
 Alexey Stukalskiy

 Karsten Sturmay
 Matt Sussman

 Gaku Suzuki
 Torkil Svensgaard

 Krystof Tabery
 Wayne Tallon

 Tyler Tardi
 Charley Thomas

 Colin Thomas
 Kendal Thompson 

 Stuart Thompson
 Alexey Timofeev
 Brandon Tippin
 Travis Tokarz

 Mārtiņš Trukšāns 
 Shunto Tsuchiya

 Suguru Tsukamoto
 Wayne Tuck Jr.
 Thomas Ulsrud

 Kazuhisa Unoura
 Thomas Usselman 
 Jaap van Dorp
 Chris Van Huyse

 Daylan Vavrek
 Sergio Vez

 Kristaps Vilks
 Mihhail Vlassov
 Shane Vollman 
 Tadas Vyskupaitis

 Steffen Walstad
 Wang Zhiyu

 Zachary Wasylik
 Scott Webb 
 Anders Westerberg 
 Wade White 

 Willie Wilberg
 John Willsey
 Jim Wilson
 Chris Wimmer

 Joey Witherspoon
 Sebastian Wunderer

 Takefumi Yamashita
 Matt Yeo
 Zou De Jia

Women's
As of December 15, 2017

 Kristina Adams
 Emily Anderson

 Sherry Anderson
 Federica Apollonio
 Meghan Armit

 Hailey Armstrong
 Jennifer Armstrong 

 Mary-Anne Arsenault
 Cathy Auld

 Courtney Auld
 Holly Baird 

 Glenys Bakker
 Maria Baksheeva

 Brett Barber 
 Penny Barker

 Madison Bear 
 Ève Bélisle

 Irina Belki
 Hayley Bergman

 Shae Bevan
 Shannon Birchard

 Regan Birr
 Hannah Bouvier

 Theresa Breen
 Madara Brēmane

 Jill Brothers
 Corryn Brown

 Joelle Brown 
 Laura Burtnyk

 Dawn Butler
 Chrissy Cadorin 

 Alyssa Calvert 
 Chelsea Carey

 Katie Chappellaz
 Candace Chisholm 

 Cory Christensen
 Jennifer Clark-Rouire

 Justine Comeau
 Shiela Cowan

 Amy Currie
 Stacie Curtis

 Calissa Daly
 Sarah Daniels 

 Anastasiia Danshina
 Delia DeJong

 Jackie Dewar
 Holly Donaldson 

 Chelsea Duncan
 Hollie Duncan

 Madeleine Dupont
 Emily Dwyer

 Chantelle Eberle
 Kerri Einarson

 Sara England
 Michelle Englot

 Lisa Farnell
 Cora Farrell
 
 Binia Feltscher
 Allison Flaxey

 Hannah Fleming 
 Shalon Fleming 

 Sarah Fletcher
 Tracy Fleury

 Grace Francisci
 Rachel Fritzler

 Susan Froud
 Satsuki Fujisawa

 Kerry Galusha
 Jaimee Gardner

 Diana Gaspari
 Gim Un-chi

 Shelly Graham
 Diane Gushulak

 Kayte Gyles
 Claire Hamilton

 Teryn Hamilton
 Heidi Hanlon

 Jacqueline Harrison
 Michelle Hartwell

 Anna Hasselborg
 Marina Hauser

 Heather Heggestad
 Ursi Hegner

 Kathy Hicks
 Krysta Hilker

 Amber Holland
 Rachel Homan

 Ashley Howard
 Jessie Hunkin

 Danielle Inglis
 Sophie Jackson

 Virginia Jackson
 Angelina Jensen

 Daniela Jentsch
 Kaitlin Jewer

 Jiang Yilun
 Colleen Jones

 Jennifer Jones
 Kaitlyn Jones

 Nicky Kaufman 
 Oona Kauste

 Raphaela Keiser
 Kim Eun-jung

 Kim Min-ji
 Shannon Kleibrink
 Linda Klimova

 Patti Knezevic
 Tori Koana

 Anna Kubešková
 Alyssa Kyllo

 Isabelle Ladouceur
 Stefanie Lawton

 Cassandra Lewin
 Kim Link

 Tene Link
 Erin Macaulay

 Kristen MacDiarmid
 Shelley MacNutt

 Robyn MacPhee
 Triin Madisson

 Colleen Madonia 
 Lindsay Makichuk 

 Sarah Mallais
 Jodi Marthaller 

 Nancy Martin 
 Chiaki Matsumura

 Mary Mattatall
 Krista McCarville

 Nancy McConnery
 Deb McCreanor 

 Julie McEvoy 
 Tiffany McLean

 Christine McMakin 
 Mei Jie 

 Briane Meilleur 
 Lisa Menard

 Sherry Middaugh
 Cindy Miller
 Victoria Moiseeva

 Daria Morozova
 Erin Morrissey

 Eve Muirhead
 Heather Munn

 Jestyn Murphy
 Mayu Natsuizaka

 Deanne Nichol
 Anette Norberg

 Ayumi Ogasawara
 Oh Eun-jin 

 Lori Olsen
 Alina Pätz

 Dorottya Palancsa 
 Virginija Paulauskaitė

 Alina Pavlyuchik
 Brittany Pearce

 Roxane Perron
 Beth Peterson

 Dailene Pewarchuk
 Colleen Pinkney

 Marta Pluta
 Ann Podoll

 Geri-Lynn Ramsay
 Cheryl Reed

 Kim Rhyme
 Darcy Robertson

 Sylvie Robichaud
 Kelsey Rocque

 Nina Roth
 Breanna Rozon

 Ieva Rudzīte
 Mone Ryokawa

 Deb Santos
 Casey Scheidegger

 Andrea Schöpp
 Jessica Schultz

 Nadine Scotland 
 Holly Scott 

 Sharon Sellars
 Mandy Selzer
 
 Marla Sherrer
 Kelly Shimizu

 Anna Sidorova
 Margaretha Sigfridsson

 Robyn Silvernagle
 Ashton Simard

 Jamie Sinclair
 Kayla Skrlik

 Kim Slattery
 Ocean Smart

 Veronica Smith
 Barb Spencer

 Laurie St-Georges
 Iveta Staša-Šaršūne

 Elena Stern 
 Kristen Streifel 

 Selena Sturmay
 Tova Sundberg

 Sierra Sutherland
 Valerie Sweeting

 Hana Synácková
 Marta Szeliga-Frynia 

 Shannon Tatlock
 Ekaterina Telnova

 Celina Thompson
 Karla Thompson 

 Julie Tippin
 Silvana Tirinzoni

 Marie Turmann
 Terry Ursel

 Kesa Van Osch
 Rhonda Varnes
 Anna Venevtseva

 Emma Wallingford
 Wang Bingyu

 Wang Zixin
 Sarah Wark

 Katelyn Wasylkiw
 Kristy Watling

 Ashley Waye
 Chantale Widmer 

 Barb Willemsen
 Maggie Wilson

 Selina Witschonke 
 Becca Wood

 Isabella Wranå
 Nora Wüest

 Nola Zingel

References
Men's teams
Women's teams

Teams
2017 in curling
2018 in curling
World Curling Tour teams